A QFL diagram or QFL triangle is a type of ternary diagram that shows compositional data from sandstones and modern sands, point counted using the Gazzi-Dickinson method.  The abbreviations used are as follows:

 Q - quartz
 F - feldspar
 L - lithic fragments

In general, the most contentious item counted is chert, which is usually counted as a lithic fragment, but is sometimes better suited in the Q pole.  When this happens, the pole is renamed 'Qt' instead of Q.

The importance of a QFL triangle is mainly demonstrated in tectonic exercises.  As first demonstrated in the 1979 paper by Bill Dickinson and Chris Suczek, the composition and provenance of a sandstone is directly related to its tectonic environment of formation.

Craton sands are clustered near the Q pole.  As sandstones, these are known as quartz arenites.
Transitional continental sands are along the QF line.  As sandstones, these are known as arkoses.
Basement uplift sands are near the F pole.  This includes "thick-skinned tectonics."  As sandstones, these are known as arkoses.
Recycled orogen sands plot near the Q pole, but with significant F and L components.  This includes "thin-skinned tectonics" common in subduction back-arc thrusting. As sandstones, these are known as lithic sandstones.
Arc sands plot along the F and L line, with sometimes significant Q components.  Clustering near the F pole indicates a dissected arc, and clustering near the L pole indicates an undissected, or new arc.  As sandstones, these are known as arkoses and/or lithic sandstones.

See also 

 Folk classification

References

Petrology
Sandstone